Cucullia santonici is a moth of the family Noctuidae. It was traditionally found from southern Europe through parts of Near East and Middle East to China.

Recent observations of its range are greatly reduced. Its western range includes small portions of Eastern Serbia, Northwestern Bulgaria and Western Romania. Its eastern range includes Northeastern Bulgaria, Eastern Romania, Northwestern Moldova & Southwestern Ukraine.

Adults are on wing from April to June and July and August. There are two generations per year.

The larvae feed on Artemisia alba, Artemisia absinthium and probably other Artemisia, Matricaria and Achillea species.

External links
Global Biodiversity Information Website
Fauna Europaea
Lepiforum.de

Cucullia
Moths described in 1813
Moths of Asia
Moths of Europe
Taxa named by Jacob Hübner